Greater Kota Kinabalu refers to the dense clusters of regional populated areas surrounding the city of Kota Kinabalu in Malaysia. It comprises the districts of Kota Kinabalu (also the largest city and capital of Sabah), Penampang, Tuaran and Papar. These districts are also part of the West Coast Division. It was forecasted that in 2019, the combined population of these districts was 1.1 million people, in a combined area of 3,277 km2.

Definition and coverage 

The term was initially coined in a policy action document prepared by Sabah Economic Development and Investment Authority (SEDIA), a special body tasked to spearhead Sabah Development Corridor. The term is also used in Sabah Structure Plan 2033, a statewide planning policy document that also includes the projected population growth trend in Kota Kinabalu and its immediate areas by year 2033. Other usage of the term is Greater Kota Kinabalu Flood Prevention Committee. A report by the Federal Economic Planning Unit defines Greater Kota Kinabalu as an area comprising the districts of Kota Kinabalu and Penampang. However, the proximity of Greater Kota Kinabalu region to outlying districts of Tuaran and Papar suggests that the region's coverage may also include parts of the latter, as the urban centres of both districts are located within 1-hour commute from Kota Kinabalu Central Business District.

Geography 

Greater Kota Kinabalu region lies on the central west coast of Sabah. The region is bounded by Crocker Range mountains immediately to the east and South China Sea to the west. The region itself consists of narrow coastal plain of average width of 10 km and is scattered with low-rise hills. The elevation ranges from the sea level to near the peak of Mount Alab at 1,951 m above sea level. Offshore, there are several islands close to Kota Kinabalu Central Business District. Significant area of these islands is part of Tunku Abdul Rahman National Park. Mengalum Island is the furthest extent of any dry land within Greater Kota Kinabalu region, at 56 km away from the Kota Kinabalu Central Business District.

Population 
In 2010, the population of Greater Kota Kinabalu was estimated at 855,556. Penampang (combined with Putatan sub-district) is the most densely populated district within the region, followed closely by Kota Kinabalu. It was forecasted that the combined population of these districts in 2019 was nearly 1.1 million.

Economy 
Greater Kota Kinabalu is the primary economic and transportation hub in Sabah. Services sector is a major economic driver in Kota Kinabalu, Penampang and Putatan. Since 2010s, services sector particularly in tourism, hospitality and retail has become a major economic driver in the region. Industrial activities are primarily concentrated in Kota Kinabalu adjacent to the city's primary transshipment port (in Sepanggar). In Tuaran and Papar, agriculture activity is more pronounced such as rice cultivation and oil palm plantation. Offshore, there are currently several active oil and gas drilling operations by major energy companies such as Petronas and Royal Dutch Shell.

Population centres

Kota Kinabalu district 

 Kota Kinabalu Central Business District
 Luyang
 Sembulan
 Tanjung Aru
 Lintas
 Kepayan
 Likas
 Kolombong
 Inanam
 Menggatal
 Alamesra
 Sepanggar
 Telipok

Penampang district 

 Donggongon
 Bandar Penampang Baru (Koidupan-Noosob/Kepayan Ridge-Lido)
 Bundusan
 Kasigui
 Putatan
 Petagas
 Lok Kawi

Tuaran district 
 Tuaran
 Kiulu
 Tamparuli
 Tenghilan

Papar district 
 Kinarut
 Papar
 Benoni
 Kimanis
 Bongawan

Transportation

Air 
Kota Kinabalu International Airport

Sea 
 Sapangar Bay Container Port
 Sapangar Bay Oil Terminal
 Kota Kinabalu Port
 Jesselton Point Ferry Terminal
 Sabah Oil and Gas Terminal

Major roads 
  Federal Route 1
  Federal Route 22
  Federal Route 500
  Federal Route 501
  Federal Route 503

Mass transit 
 Western Sabah Railway Line

Administration 
There are five local governments within Greater Kota Kinabalu region:

 Kota Kinabalu City Hall
 Penampang District Council
 Tuaran District Council
 Papar District Council

Subsequent usage 
Usage of the term 'Greater Kota Kinabalu' slowly gain traction in recent years, especially in real estate sector. However, because of the separate administrative jurisdictions within Greater Kota Kinabalu, the term is not an officially recognised statistical area by the Department of Statistics Malaysia, and tracking population data remains based on individual districts. Despite the sporadic usage of the term in some public policy documents, there is no firm groundwork to establish a dedicated singular body that can represent or govern areas under Greater Kota Kinabalu, to address shared challenges such as meeting population growth needs and minimising development impact on sensitive areas. Hence, present socio-economic policy directions tend to focus heavily towards Kota Kinabalu district itself, rather than the entire Greater Kota Kinabalu region. On the other hand, the increasing socio-economic integration and interdependency among the districts of Kota Kinabalu, Penampang, Tuaran and Papar been recognised in other ways, thus indirectly reaffirms the feasible existence of Greater Kota Kinabalu as an inter-dependent socio-economic regional entity.

Water resource conflict 
In 2018, the Sabah government had proposed a water supply dam in Upper Papar, a sparsely populated area on the foothills of Crocker Range mountains in Papar. The proposal was a long-term measure to meet the expected increase of water usage demand in the state's west coast. The Member of Parliament for Papar supports the proposal as a catalyst to increase development in the west coast and attract investments, especially in Papar. The proposal has been met with fierce objection by the locals residing in the area citing that the realisation of the project would mean loss of land which has been settled for generations. The controversy surrounding the project partly contributed to the loss of the Warisan-led state government in 2020 Sabah state election. Currently, there is no indication that the project is cancelled.

2020–2021 pandemic movement control order 

Since October 2020, as part of the strategies to stem COVID-19 infection, inter-district travel restriction has been imposed periodically throughout Sabah. However, the districts of Kota Kinabalu, Penampang and Putatan are grouped into a single 'unified' district and residents between these districts are allowed to move freely without restriction. This is owing to the fact that socio-economic activities and movements between these districts are highly intertwined, and imposing restriction on a basis of individual district would have caused further economic disruption. As the infection rate slows, the inter-district travel restriction is further loosened into zoning restriction, whereby restriction of movement is based on zones. The entire West Coast Division, comprising the districts of Kota Kinabalu, Penampang, Tuaran, Papar, Kota Belud and Ranau, is grouped into a single zone. Travel between districts within a zone is not restricted.

References 

Kota Kinabalu
K